Black Rock Hot Springs are a small system of thermal springs west of the town of Arroyo Hondo, New Mexico.

Description
The hot spring water emerges from a group of basalt boulders next to the Rio Grandé, and are accessible when the river is low. The spring water collections in several small, primitive rock-lined soaking pools. The largest gravel-bottomed soaking pool is 4 feet deep and 12 feet in diameter. The soaking pools on occasion get washed out by the river. They have never been commercially developed.

Water profile

The water temperature at the source is 106 °F. The temperature varies in the soaking pools where it can be mixed with river water. The largest soaking pool is approximately 98 °F.

See also
List of hot springs in the United States

References

Hot springs
Geothermal areas in the United States
Taos County, New Mexico
Springs of New Mexico